This is a list of car bomb attacks (including bombs stowed in vans, trucks, buses etc.) that resulted in at least two deaths.

Mass car bombings (by date)

2020s

2010s

2000s

1990s

1980s

1970s

1900–1969

List of Irgun operations 1937-48,

See also
 Deaths by car bombing

Notes 

Car and truck bombings
Car bombings, mass